Lijndenia is a genus of plant in family Melastomataceae. The genus includes 13 species.

Species include:
 Lijndenia barteri K. Bremer 
 Lijndenia bequaertii  (De Wild.) Borhidi	 
 Lijndenia brenanii  (A. Fern. & R. Fern.) Jacq.-Fél.
 Lijndenia capitellata  K. Bremer
 Lijndenia danguyana  (H. Perrier) Jacq.-Fél.  
 Lijndenia fragrans  (A. Fern. & R. Fern.) Borhidi 
 Lijndenia greenwayi  (Brenan) Borhidi	   
 Lijndenia jasminoides  (Gilg) Borhidi	    
 Lijndenia lutescens  (Naudin) Jacq.-Fél.	  
 Lijndenia melastomoides  (Naudin) Jacq.-Fél.	   
 Lijndenia procteri  (A. Fern. & R. Fern.) Borhidi	  
 Lijndenia roborea  (Naudin) Jacq.-Fél.	    
 Lijndenia semseii  (A. Fern. & R. Fern.) Borhidi

References

 
Melastomataceae genera
Taxonomy articles created by Polbot
Taxa named by Heinrich Zollinger
Taxa named by Alexander Moritzi